Macro-Yaeyama is one of the two branches of the Southern Ryukyuan languages, comprising the Yaeyama and Yonaguni languages. It is defined by the development of "know" as a potential auxiliary, the semantic extension of "nephew" to being gender-neutral, and unique forms of the words exhibited by the table below.

Although Yonaguni has historically been classified as either a primary branch of Ryukyuan or of the Southern Ryukyuan languages, its close relationship with Yaeyama is clear.

References

Languages of Japan
Ryukyuan languages
Ryukyu Islands